All Boys Aren't Blue is a young adult non-fiction "memoir-manifesto" by journalist and activist George M. (Matthew) Johnson, published April 28, 2020, by Farrar, Straus and Giroux.

The book consists of a series of essays following Johnson's journey growing up as a queer Black man in Plainfield, New Jersey, and Virginia. In addition to describing Johnson's own experience, it directly addresses Black queer boys who may not have someone in their life with similar experiences.

Plot 
The book discusses consent, agency, and sexual abuse, alongside various other topics. It also describes two sexual encounters and statutory rape.

Background 
Johnson was motivated to write All Boys Aren't Blue by Toni Morrison, whose maxim "If there's a book you want to read, but it hasn't been written yet, then you must write it," which Johnson has tattooed on their right arm.

The "blue" in the title carries several meanings, being the color of masculinity and the color of police officers, who have disproportionately invoked violence against queer Black people. The title also pays homage to the character Blue from Queen Sugar, as well as the appearance of Black skin in Moonlight and the play it is based upon, In Moonlight Black Boys Look Blue.

Reception

Critical reception 
All Boys Aren't Blue received a starred review from Kirkus, as well as positive reviews from School Library Journal, Booklist, and Publishers Weekly.

Kirkus called the book "[a] critical, captivating, merciful mirror for growing up Black and queer today."

Publishers Weekly noted, "Though at first glance the book lacks the synthesizing call to action that "manifesto" would imply, its "be yourself" message remains a radical stance for doubly marginalized individuals." They continued to say, “In a publishing landscape in need of queer black voices, readers who are sorting through similar concepts will be grateful to join him on the journey,” and called it "a balm and testimony to young readers as allies in the fight for equality."

The New York Times called it "[a]n exuberant, unapologetic memoir infused with a deep but clear-eyed love for its subjects."

HuffPost wrote that it was "an unflinching testimony that carves out space for Black queer kids to be seen."

Bitch Magazine said that "All Boys Aren't Blue is a game changer".

Kirkus named All Boys Aren't Blue one of the best young adult biographies/memoirs of 2020. The New York Public Library and Chicago Public Library also included it in their list of the top ten books of 2020 for young adults.

Awards and honors

Censorship 
All Boys Aren't Blue has frequently been censored because it includes LGBTQIA+ content and profanity; it is also "considered to be sexually explicit." In 2021, the American Library Association's Office of Intellectual Freedom named it the third most banned and challenged book in the United States of the year. School boards in at least ten states have removed the book from their libraries.

In 2021, Flagler County School Board member and retired teacher Jill Woolbright filed a criminal complaint against the Superintendent for carrying the book, objecting to mentions of masturbation and oral sex. The Flagler County Sheriff's Office found that the content of the book was not a violation of law and did not warrant further investigation. The removal of the book prompted student protests.

In 2021, the Wentzville School Board in Missouri banned All Boys Aren't Blue, alongside three other books, from the district's high school libraries. Other books included in the ban were Toni Morrison’s The Bluest Eye, Kiese Laymon’s Heavy: An American Memoir, and Alison Bechdel’s Fun Home.

In 2022, All Boys Aren't Blue was listed among 52 books banned by the Alpine School District following the implementation of Utah law H.B. 374, “Sensitive Materials In Schools," 42% of which “feature LBGTQ+ characters and or themes.” Many of the books were removed because they were considered to contain pornographic material according to the new law, which defines porn using the following criteria:

 "The average person" would find that the material, on the whole, "appeals to prurient interest in sex"
 The material "is patently offensive in the description or depiction of nudity, sexual conduct, sexual excitement, sadomasochistic abuse, or excretion"
 The material, on the whole, "does not have serious literary, artistic, political or scientific value."

Adaptation 
All Boys Aren't Blue was adapted into a short film in 2021. The film was directed by Nathan Hale Williams and stars Dyllón Burnside.

All Boys Aren't Blue was optioned to be developed as a TV series by actress Gabrielle Union.

External Link 
Unbanned Books, Brooklyn Public Library

References  

2020 books
2020s LGBT literature
American anthologies
LGBT and multiculturalism
LGBT literature in the United States
LGBT young adult literature
Queer literature
Race and society
Young adult non-fiction books
Censored books
Farrar, Straus and Giroux books
LGBT autobiographies
Obscenity controversies in literature
LGBT-related controversies in literature
Censorship of LGBT issues